Tara Nethercott is an American politician and a Republican member of the Wyoming Senate representing District 4 since January 10, 2017.

Career
Nethercott is a practicing attorney in Cheyenne.

Elections

2016
When incumbent Republican Senator Tony Ross announced his retirement, Nethercott announced her candidacy for the seat.  Nethercott defeated David Pope and Bill Weaver in the Republican primary with 46% of the vote. She defeated Democratic State Representative Ken Esquibel in the general election with 60% of the vote.

References

External links
Profile from Ballotpedia
Campaign Website

21st-century American politicians
21st-century American women politicians
Living people
Politicians from Cheyenne, Wyoming
University of Wyoming alumni
Women state legislators in Wyoming
Republican Party Wyoming state senators
Year of birth missing (living people)